Group D of the 1994 Federation Cup Americas Zone was one of four pools in the Americas zone of the 1994 Federation Cup. Four teams competed in a round robin competition, with the top three teams advancing to the knockout stage.

Cuba vs. Dominican Republic

Bolivia vs. Guatemala

Cuba vs. Guatemala

Bolivia vs. Dominican Republic

Cuba vs. Bolivia

Guatemala vs. Dominican Republic

See also
Fed Cup structure

References

External links
 Fed Cup website

1994 Federation Cup Americas Zone